The 2019 WAFU U-20 Tournament was the second edition of the international U-20 men's football event for teams under the West African Football Union. The competition was hosted by Guinea in November to December 2019 in two match venues.

Host Guinea, Mauritania, Senegal and Sierra Leone make up Group A whilst Liberia, Mali and Gambia complete Group B (as Guinea-Bissau withdrew).

Matches were held at Stade du 28 Septembre and the Nongo Stadium, both in Conakry, Guinea.

Participants

Group A

Group B

Officials

Referees
 Younoussa Tawel Camara (Guinea) 
 Lamin Jammeh (Gambia)  
 Reinaldo Domingos Barbosa (Guinea-Bissau)
 Raphiou Ligali (Benin)
 Hassan Corneh (Liberia)
 Y. G. Mawabwè Bodjona  (Togo)
 Alioune Sandigui (Senegal)

Assistant Referees
 Mustapha Bojang (Guinea)
 Yamoussa Sillah (Guinea)
 Amadou Ngom  (Senegal)
 Abdulmajeed Olaide (Nigeria)
 Nouhoum Bamba (Mali)
 Soufia Abdou Garba (Niger)
 Joel Wanka Doe (Liberia)
 Musa Alieu Sandy (Sierra Leone)
 Kalidou Delba Ba (Mauritania)

Player eligibility
Players born 1 January 1999 or later are eligible to participate in the competition.

Group stage
The top two teams of each group advance to the semi-finals.

Tiebreakers
Teams are ranked according to points (3 points for a win, 1 point for a draw, 0 points for a loss), and if tied on points, the following tie-breaking criteria are applied, in the order given, to determine the rankings.
Points in head-to-head matches among tied teams;
Goal difference in all group matches;
Goals scored in all group matches;
Disciplinary points (yellow card = 1 point, red card as a result of two yellow cards = 3 points, direct red card = 3 points, yellow card followed by direct red card = 4 points);
Drawing of lots.
If, after applying criteria 1 to 3 to several teams, more than two teams still have an equal ranking, criteria 1 to 3 are reapplied exclusively to the matches between the two teams in question to determine their final rankings. If this procedure does not lead to a decision, criteria 7 to 9 apply;
Points in head-to-head matches among tied teams;
Goal difference in matches between the teams concerned;
The greatest number of goals scored in the matches between the teams concerned.

All times are local UTC±00:00.

Group A

Group B

Knockout stage

Bracket

Semi-finals

Third place match

Final

Winners

Awards

References

International association football competitions hosted by Guinea
Foo